The Summertime Oaks is an American Thoroughbred horse race run annually in June at Santa Anita Park in Arcadia, California. The Grade II event is open to three-year-old fillies willing to race on dirt at a distance of one and one-sixteenth miles. The race was inaugurated in 1946 as the Hollywood Oaks and was originally run at Hollywood Park Racetrack.

Following the closure of Hollywood Park in 2013, the race was transferred to Santa Anita Park. At the same time, the purse was increased from $150,000 to $200,000.

Since inception, the race has been contested at various distances:
 1 mile : 1946, 1948–1950
 7 furlongs : 1947
  miles : 1951-1953, 2002–present
  miles : 1954-2001

Records
Speed record:
 1:41.55 - House of Fortune (2004) (at current distance of  miles)
 1:46.93 - Lakeway (1994) (at previous distance of  miles)

Most wins by a jocky
 5 - Ed Delahoussaye (1989, 1991, 1993, 1999, 2001)

Most wins by a trainer
 4 - Bob Baffert (2003, 200, 2014, 2017)

Winners

Earlier winners

1984 - Moment To Buy
1983 - Heartlight No. One
1982 - Tango Dancer
1981 - Past Forgetting
1980 - Princess Karenda
1979 - Prize Spot
1978 - B Thoughtful
1977 - Glenaris
1976 - Answer
1975 - Nicosia
1974 - Miss Musket
1973 - Sandy Blue
1972 - Pallisima
1971 - Turkish Trousers
1970 - Last Of The Line
1969 - Tipping Time
1968 - Hooplah
1967 - Amerigo Lady
1966 - Spearfish
1965 - Straight Deal II
1964 - Loukahl
1963 - Delhi Maid
1962 - Dingle Bay 
1961 - Rose O'Neill
1960 - Paris Pike
1959 - Sybil Brand
1958 - Midnight Date
1957 - Market Basket
1956 - Candy Dish
1955 - Baby Alice
1954 - Miz Clementine
1953 - Fleet Khal
1952 - A Gleam
1951 - Ruth Lily
1950 - Mrs. Fuddy
1949 - June Bride
1948 - Flying Rhythm
1947 - U Time
1946 - Honeymoon

Notes

References
 The 2009 Hollywood Oaks at the NTRA
 Ten Things You Should Know about the Hollywood Oaks at Hello Race Fans!

Horse races in California
Hollywood Park Racetrack
Santa Anita Park
Graded stakes races in the United States
Flat horse races for three-year-old fillies
Recurring sporting events established in 1946
1946 establishments in California